Emma Hill was an American film editor active in Hollywood during the late 1920s through the mid-1930s.

Selected filmography 

 Convention Girl (1935)
 The Cheat (1931)
 My Sin (1931)
 The Night Angel (1931)
 Stolen Heaven (1931)
 The Big Pond (1930)
 Young Man of Manhattan (1930)
 The Battle of Paris (1929)

References

External links

American film editors
American women film editors
Year of birth missing
Year of death missing